Ciencias Club de Rugby (known as Ciencias Fundación Cajasol for sponsorship reasons) is a Spanish rugby team based in Seville, Spain.

Honours 
Spanish championship
Champions: 1992 and 1994
Spanish King's cup
Champions: 1994, 1995 and 1996
Runners-up: 1997
Spanish second division
Champions: 2004, 2016 and 2019
Copa Ibérica
Champions: 1995
Runners-up: 1993

Season by season

31 seasons in División de Honor
7 seasons in División de Honor B

Squad 2012–13

International honours
  Javier de Juan
  Corey Smith
  Kurt Morath
  Oscar Durán
  Leonardo de Oliveira
  Juan Francisco Galindo
  Sebastián Hattori
  José María Bohórquez
  Leandro Fernández
  Jesús Recuerda
  Rafael Camacho
  Alejandro Ortega
  Carlos Arenas
  Jeremías Palumbo
  Manuel Mazo
  Jorge Prieto

Other notable players
  Andrea Bresolin Former player from Petrarca Padova in italien Super10

External links
Official site

Spanish rugby union teams
Sport in Seville
Sports teams in Andalusia
Rugby clubs established in 1972